Dragutin Friedrich (5 January 1897 – 26 March 1980) was a Croatian footballer who represented the national team of the Kingdom of Serbs, Croats and Slovenes at the 1924 Summer Olympics, but he did not play in any matches.

International career
He made his debut for Yugoslavia in a June 1922 King Alexandru's Cup match against Romania and earned a total of 9 caps, scoring no goals. His final international was an April 1927 friendly match away against Hungary.

References

External links
 

1897 births
1980 deaths
Sportspeople from Koprivnica
People from the Kingdom of Croatia-Slavonia
Association football goalkeepers
Yugoslav footballers
Yugoslavia international footballers
Footballers at the 1924 Summer Olympics
Olympic footballers of Yugoslavia
NK Slaven Belupo players
HAŠK players